The Fighting Stallion is a 1950 American Western film directed by Robert Emmett Tansey.

Plot summary

Cast
Bill Edwards as Lon Evans
Doris Merrick as Jeanne Barton
Forrest Taylor as Martin Evans
Don C. Harvey as Commander Patrick
Robert Carson as Tom Adams
Concha Ybarra as Nantee
Gene Alsace as Lem
Merrill McCormick as Yancy
Johnny Carpenter as Chuck
Maria Hart as Dude

Soundtrack

External links

1950 films
1950s English-language films
1950 Western (genre) films
Eagle-Lion Films films
Cinecolor films
American Western (genre) films
Films about horses
Films directed by Robert Emmett Tansey
1950s American films